Prince François of Orléans, Count of Clermont (François Henri Louis Marie; 7 February 1961 – 30 December 2017) was the eldest son and heir apparent of Prince Henri, Count of Paris, Duke of France, who died in 2019, Orleanist pretender to the French throne, by his wife Duchess Marie Therese of Württemberg. He was the thus Dauphin of France in Orleanist reckoning. However, his mother had been infected with toxoplasmosis during her second and third pregnancies, and the pre-natal exposure left both Prince François and his younger sister, Princess Blanche, developmentally disabled.

His godparents were Henri, Count of Paris (paternal grandfather) and Duchess Rosa of Württemberg (maternal grandmother).

François was about two or three months old, according to his father (then styled Count of Clermont as Orleanist heir-apparent), before the family realized that he had a disability. During his early childhood the family dwelt in Haute-Savoie, although his father was often away on military assignment or business. When he was 13, his parents separated and François spent weekdays in a facility at Beaumont-sur-Oise and, from the early 1980s, in a L'Arche community, rejoining his mother and siblings at the Orléans estate in Dreux on weekends, while sometimes vacationing with his paternal grandmother at the Chateau d'Eu where she taught him to walk when he was four or five.

In 1981 his grandfather, the Count of Paris, having declared Clermont deprived of his dynastic rights for an unauthorized civil remarriage after divorce, publicly announced that he would be succeeded as claimant to the French throne by Prince Jean, younger brother of François, in light of the latter's incapacity. Although the Count subsequently relented and declared Clermont restored in his rights as the first-born son, when Clermont succeeded as Count of Paris in 1999, he reinstated François as the next heir on the grounds that his father's act had been ultra vires. He established a council of regency to exercise the dynastic prerogative on François's behalf, to become effective upon the succession of François as claimant. In 2016 Jean declared that his father's appointment of a regency council was invalid and, having become his elder brother's legal guardian, promised to continue to care for him while also called for François "to be left in peace and not used."

On 31 December 2017 Prince Jean reported that after suffering a bad fall the previous day, François had died. Henri subsequently recognized Jean as "the Dauphin", father and son publicly embracing at the interment of François at the Chapelle royale de Dreux on 6 January 2018 following a funeral service attended by his parents, siblings and other members of family, as well as members of reigning and deposed dynasties.

Ancestry

References

 Philippe de Montjouvent, Le comte de Paris et sa descendance, Du Chaney Eds, Paris, 1998, .
 Georges Poisson, Les Orléans, une famille en quête d'un trône, Perrin, Paris, 1999 .
 Henri d'Orléans, Ma Vie, Tallandier, Paris, 2003.
 Henri d'Orléans, À mes fils, Albin Michel, Paris, 1990.

1961 births
2017 deaths
Francois de France, Comte de Clermont, Prince
Counts of Clermont-en-Beauvaisis
People from Boulogne-Billancourt
Burials at the Chapelle royale de Dreux
Heirs apparent who never acceded